Asiavision is a non-profit daily news broadcasting by satellite and file transfer by the Asia-Pacific Broadcasting Union (ABU). Broadcast by television stations in 34 countries in Asia, it debuted in January 1984 and aims to bring together several prominent broadcasting stations in Asia with its purpose to promote free exchange of news among broadcasters in Asia, in a non-political or commercial manner.

Its members include: RTA–Afghanistan, Saba TV-Afghanistan, BTV–Bangladesh, BBS–Bhutan, RTB–Brunei Darussalam, CTN-Cambodia, CCTV–China, FBC-Fiji, FijiTV-Fiji, TVB–Hong Kong, DDI–India,  TVRI-Indonesia, IRIB–Iran, NHK–Japan, TDM–Macau, RTM–Malaysia, TVM-Maldives, TV5–Mongolia, MRTV-Myanmar, Forever Group–Myanmar, NTV–Nepal, KCTV–North Korea, EMTV–Papua New Guinea,  ABS-CBN-Philippines, PTV-Philippines IBC-Philippines,
SBC-Samoa, CNA–Singapore, KBS-South Korea, SLRC–Sri Lanka, MCOT–Thailand, Thai PBS-Thailand, RTTL–Timor Leste, TRT–Turkey, TMTV-Turkmenistan, MTRK-Uzbekistan, TBV-Vanuatu and VTV-Vietnam.

History 
Asiavision was launched on January 15, 1984, with seven members: BTV, RTB, CCTV, TVRI-Indonesia, RTM, PTV and SLRC. Three other founder members, NHK, KBS/MBC-Korea and IRIB, joined in April 1984. It became a fully digital station in January 2001. The news exchange had one daily satellite feed until May 2005, when a second feed was launched to handle the growing number of offers from members.

The Friedrich Ebert Foundation (FES) of Germany provided extensive support to the news exchange in its early years. In 1990 Dr Erich Vogt of FES wrote: "The launching of Asiavision has changed the whole scenario relating to the flow of information in the Asia-Pacific region."

Background
Asiavision has its operations centre in the Malaysian capital, Kuala Lumpur, and is coordinated by ABU Secretariat staff. Asiavision has two satellite transmissions a day. The first is from 0830 to 0900 GMT and the second from 1215 to 1235 GMT. Transmission is on AsiaSat 5. More than 9,000 items are exchanged each year.

Besides the daily transmissions, news flashes are arranged for important, breaking stories such as natural disasters or major political events.

Among the major news events covered by Asiavision in 2011 were the earthquake and tsunami in Japan on 11 March, which claimed more than 15 thousand lives. Japan's public broadcaster, NHK, covered the aftermath on a daily basis for the news exchange.

File transfer system 
Asiavision has launched a file transfer system for exchanging news items online. It operates alongside the existing satellite-based news exchange. Members upload and download news stories by logging into the Asiavision file transfer website. Members underwent file transfer training at a meeting of Asiavision news and technical coordinators in New Delhi in November 2009, hosted by DDI.

Training 
Asiavision organises funded training courses for its members. The latest are the Asianews project, a series of regional news workshops being held in partnership with Canal France International (CFI), and a Sports News Workshop in Kuala Lumpur in June 2011.

Earlier events included a workshop on covering avian flu, a course on environmental journalism, a broadcast news workshop for young journalists, a course on the responsibilities of a chief editor, a seminar on issues facing news directors in Asia and technical training on satellite uplinks, and a workshop on digital newsrooms, held in Mumbai in December 2009 in partnership with CFI.

Asiavision Advisory Service 
The Asiavision Advisory Service is an initiative under which Asiavision provides funding for in-house training and consultancies for members. Recent events have included a week of news training each for RTA and Saba TV in Kabul, training for news staff of RTM in Kuala Lumpur and Kuching, three weeks of training at BBS in Thimphu and a workshop for staff of TDM in Macau.

Asiavision awards 
Each year, members hold a ballot to select the winners of the Asiavision Annual Awards, given for the quality of contributions to the news exchange. The 2011 winners are NHK, MCOT and CCTV.

An annual prize, the Dennis Anthony Memorial Award, is given for the best Asiavision news story of the year. The winner in 2011 was NHK, for its coverage of the 11 March disaster.

Attachment scheme 

Asiavision runs an attachment scheme under which journalists from member organisations spend up to one month at the Asiavision centre in Kuala Lumpur. They help Asiavision staff coordinate the news exchange. Since 2004, journalists from BBS, BTV, CCTV, CNA, IRIB, MCOT, NTV, RTB, SLRC and TV5 have taken part in the scheme.

ABU News Group 
The ABU News Group sets policy for Asiavision. The group brings together heads of news and other senior journalists from ABU members. Its present chairman is Ms Prattana Nuntaratpun of MCOT-Thailand. The group's most recent meeting was in Kathmandu on 14–15 July 2011, opened by Nepal's Prime Minister, Mr Jhalanath Khanal. It will next meet in Hanoi in mid-2012.

Journalist safety 
Asiavision has taken a strong stand in support of the safety of journalists. Through the News Group it has endorsed the International News Safety Institute's wide-ranging safety code for journalists who work in hostile environments. Asiavision has also provided funding for journalist safety training in the Philippines, Singapore and Thailand. It held a seminar on news safety in Langkawi, Malaysia, on 1 April 2011 at which members drew up wide-ranging news safety guidelines. These were approved by the News Group in July 2011.

Partners 
Asiavision works closely with a number of international partners, including CNN, Canal France International and Eurovision, the network of the European Broadcasting Union.

References

External links
 Asia-Pacific Broadcasting Union

Television channels and stations established in 1984
Television news